Yashiʽ, also called Bayt Yashiʽ, is a small town in Khamir District of 'Amran Governorate, Yemen. It is located 9km northwest of Hamidah, beyond the northern end of Jabal Iyal Yazid. It has historically been part of Bani ʽAbd territory.

Name and history 
According to the 10th-century writer al-Hamdani, Yashiʽ (which he calls Qasr Yashiʽ) is named after one Yashīʽ b. Riyām b. Nahafān, of the tribe of Hamdan. Yashiʽ has been inhabited since pre-Islamic times, and its ancient ruins are still visible. The Sirat of al-Abbasi mentions Yashiʽ three times; in one episode, the first Imam of Yemen, al-Hadi ila'l-Haqq Yahya, traveled to Yashiʽ in 286 AH (899-900 CE) to meet with the sheikhs of nearby al-ʽAsum. He chastised them for their supposed licentious behavior, and they repented and pledged their support for al-Hadi's rule.

Notes

References 

Populated places in 'Amran Governorate